Róbert Varga (born 3 April 1995) is a Slovak professional ice hockey player currently playing for Vlci Žilina of the Slovak 1. Liga

Career
Varga made his senior debut for the MHC Martin during the 2015–16 season, when he played 41 games with 3 goals.

Career statistics

Regular season and playoffs

International

References

External links
 

1995 births
Living people
Slovak ice hockey left wingers
HK Trnava players
MHC Martin players
HC Nové Zámky players
HC '05 Banská Bystrica players
MHk 32 Liptovský Mikuláš players
Bratislava Capitals players
HK Nitra players
MsHK Žilina players
Ice hockey people from Bratislava
Slovak expatriate ice hockey players in Finland